The 1957 European Women's Artistic Gymnastics Championships took place in Bucharest, Romania. It was the first European competition for female artistic gymnastics.

Medalists

Results

All-around

Vault

Uneven bars

Balance beam

Floor

References

1957
1957
International gymnastics competitions hosted by Romania
European Women's Artistic Gymnastics Championships, 1957
Euro